Ribița is a commune in Hunedoara County, Transylvania, Romania. It is composed of six villages: Crișan (formerly Vaca; Váka), Dumbrava de Jos (Alsózsunk), Dumbrava de Sus (Felsőzsunk), Ribicioara (Ribicsora), Ribița and Uibărești (Újbáresd).

Natives
 Vlaicu Bârna

References

Communes in Hunedoara County
Localities in Transylvania
Mining communities in Romania